Sir Jeffrey Jowell  is a practising barrister at Blackstone Chambers specialising in public law (including constitutional, administrative, human rights and the design and implementation of national constitutions). He was the inaugural Director of the Bingham Centre for the Rule of Law from 2010 - 2015. He is Emeritus Professor of Public Law at University College London where he was Dean of the Law Faculty and a Vice Provost. He is the author of leading publications in his field (see selected bibliography).

In 2011 he was appointed Knight Commander of the Order of St. Michael and St. George (KCMG) for "services to human rights, democracy and the rule of law in Europe". He is a Bencher of Middle Temple and holds honorary degrees from the Universities of Athens, Ritsumeikan, Cape Town and Paris 2. He is an Honorary Fellow of University College London and Hertford College, Oxford. In 2016 he was awarded the National Order of the Southern Cross by the President of Brazil for his contribution to constitutionalism and the rule of law internationally. In 2020 he was elected as a Member of the American Academy of Arts and Sciences. He has variously been listed as one of The Times' most influential lawyers.

Jowell has held a number of public appointments including Non-Executive Director of the Office of Rail Regulation; Member of the Royal Commission on Environmental Pollution; Chair of the British Waterways Ombudsman Committee, Chair of the Council of the Institute for Philanthropy, and Trustee of a number of charities, including the Sigrid Rausing Trust and the UK Branch of the South African Constitutional Court Trust. He is a member of the Foreign Secretary's Advisory committee on Human Rights. Between 2000 - 2011 he was the UK's member on the Council of Europe's Commission for Democracy through Law ("The Venice Commission").

Professional life 
Jowell's professional career includes a mix of academic scholarship, academic and other administration, and practice as a barrister and constitutional advisor.

Scholarship 
Jowell has produced leading publications on a number of legal issues, but his principal work can be divided into four strands. His first published paper made the case for a statute against racial and religious discrimination at a time when the UK had none. That paper (which influenced the campaign to introduce anti-discrimination laws in the mid-sixties) also dealt with the institutional means to achieve the most effective implementation of such laws (rejecting a criminal approach).  This interest in institutional design led to his second major area of interest, the merits and demerits of judicial control of administrative discretion, challenging the widely held view at that time that such as welfare recipients needed no right to challenge decisions to grant or refuse their benefits.  He then turned to a third issue, neglected at the time, of the extent to which judges could interfere with the substance of, rather than the procedure by which, decisions are made by public bodies (under the notions of ‘unreasonableness’ and ‘proportionality’). This was followed by work on the related issue of ‘judicial deference’ more generally. After his involvement in the drafting process of the South African constitution,  he turned to a fourth issue: the extent to which certain principles or rights are implied in the UK’s uncodified constitution, and in particular, whether the principles of equality and the rule of law are inherent components of the UK's constitution, and indeed of any constitutional democracy. 

In 1993, Jowell joined Lord Woolf as joint author of the leading text, de Smith’s Judicial Review (then in its third edition, now in its eighth), which proved to be an important channel through which to advance his ideas to the practising profession.

Academic Administration 
During the course of his academic career Jowell was, on two occasions, Dean  of University College London’s Law Faculty In between, he was a Vice Provost of UCL and Head of its Graduate School, where he advocated its new School of Public Policy. In both roles he advanced programmes to make UCL more connected to London intellectual life and to involve practitioners and judges in its legal work. He was one of the first law deans to engage in successful fundraising, concentrating on developing the Faculty into a leading international centre of comparative law, with the opportunity for students to study in the great universities of Europe and elsewhere. This attracted outstanding scholars, such as Professor Ronald Dworkin, to UCL’s Law Faculty, which was consistently rated as one of the top law schools in the country.

In 2010 Jowell was appointed the inaugural Director of the Bingham Centre for the Rule of Law, which soon established itself as a significant centre for the study and promotion of the rule of law, considering issues such as devolution, closed trials, schools programmes, immigrants’ rights, the rule of law in Parliament etc. The Centre also worked on rule of law matters abroad, in countries such as Myanmar, Bahrain and Turkey.

Practice and advice 
Jowell has always combined his academic life with  practice at the English Bar, in Blackstone Chambers. He advises over a broad range of public law and human rights issues, particularly in relation to the powers and accountability of public officials.  He has appeared in the UK Supreme Court, the Privy Council, and also the courts of countries such as Malawi, the Southern African Development Community Tribunal in Namibia, in Bermuda and the Cayman Islands. As one of a small number of experts on the drafting of national constitutions, he has been involved in the constitutions of South Africa, the Cayman Islands, the Maldives, Sri Lanka, Georgia, the Gambia and elsewhere. He has regularly advised on the constitutions of a number of British Overseas Territories and Crown Dependencies. As the UK’s member on the Venice Commission (the Council of Europe’s Commission for Democracy Through Law) he advised on the constitutions and public law of a number of countries in Central and Eastern Europe and the Balkans, chairing the committee which produced the Commission’s influential document on The Rule of Law.

Personal life 

Jeffrey Jowell was born on 4 November 1938 in Cape Town, South Africa. He attended the University of Cape Town (BA. LL.B 1961), where he was active in the student resistance to the growing apartheid measures at that time. He then studied at Oxford University (MA 1963), where he was President of the Oxford Union, and at Harvard Law School (LLM 1966;  SJD 1970). In 1963 he married Frances Suzman, an art historian, daughter of the physician Moses Suzman and Helen Suzman, the anti-apartheid activist and politician.

They have two children, Daniel Jowell QC and Joanna Jowell, and four grandchildren.  

Jowell's younger brother Sir Roger Jowell was a social statistician who also settled in the UK.

Selected publications
 Jowell J., Lord Woolf et al,. de Smith's Judicial Review (8th ed. 2018). Thomson Reuters.
 Jowell J. (Ed. with O'Cinneide, C). The Changing Constitution (9th ed. 2018). Oxford University Press.
 Jowell J. The Rule of Law. The Changing Constitution (2018) p. 3.
 Jowell J. and Rose D., Beyond Anisminic: The Rule of Law and Ouster Clauses after Privacy International  in D.Clarry (ed.), The Supreme Court Yearbook (2018–19) p 140.
 Jowell J. Brexit Judicialised: Crown v Parliament Again. The UK Supreme Court Yearbook (2016–17) p. 238.
 Jowell J. Proportionality and Unreasonableness: Neither Merger nor Takeover.  H.Wilberg and M. Elliott (Ed.) The Scope and Intensity of Substantive Review (2015) page 41 (Bloomsbury).
 Jowell J et al, The Barclay Case : Beyond Kilbrandon. The Jersey and Guernsey Law Review (Feb. 2017).
 Jowell, J. (2006). Parliamentary Sovereignty under the New Constitutional Hypothesis. Public Law, Autumn 2006, 562-579.
 Jowell, J. (2003). Administrative Law. In V. Bognador (Ed.), The British Constitution in the Twentieth Century (pp. 373–400). Oxford: Oxford University Press.
 Jowell, J. (2003). Judicial Deference and Human Rights: A Question of Competence. In P. Craig, R. Rawlings (Eds.), Law and Administration in Europe: Essays in Honour of Carol Harlow (pp. 67–81). Oxford University Press.
 Jowell,J. The Road to Constitutionalism in the UK.  In G.Nolte (ed.), European and US Constitutionalism. Science and Technique of Democracy Series, no.37, COE 2003, p. 21
 Jowell, J. (2003). Judicial deference: servility, civility or institutional capacity?. Public Law, Winter 2003, 592-601.
 Jowell, J. (2002). Administrative Justice and the New Constitutionalism in the United Kingdom. In H. Corder, L. Vijver (Eds.), Realising Administrative Justice.
 Jowell, J.  (2000). "Beyond the Rule of Law: Towards Constitutional Judicial Review". Public Law, Winter, 671-683.
 Jowell, J. L. (1999). Of Vires and Vacuums: the Constitutional Context of Judicial Review. Public Law, 448-460.
 Jowell, J. L. (1997). European Administrative Law: A Case Study in Convergence. In H. Corder, T. Maluwa (Eds.), Administrative Justice in Southern Africa (pp. 177–184). Cape Town: University of Cape Town.
 Jowell J.  Is Equality a Constitutional Principle? Current Legal Problems (1994).
 Jowell J (with Lester A). Beyond Wednesbury: Substantive Principles of Judicial Review. Public Law, 1987.
 Jowell J. The Legal Control of Administrative Discretion. Public Law 1973.
 Jowell, J. Lord Denning’s Contribution to Administrative Law, in J.Jowell and JPWB McAuslan (ed), Lord Denning: The Judge and the Law. 1984.
 Jowell J Law and Bureaucracy: Administrative Discretion and the Limits of Legal Action (Dunellen Press) (1975).
 Jowell J. The Administrative Enforcement of Laws Against Discrimination. Public Law. 1965.

References

External links
 Biography at Blacksone Chambers

Living people
Knights Commander of the Order of St Michael and St George
Year of birth missing (living people)
University of Cape Town alumni
Alumni of the University of Oxford
Presidents of the Oxford Union
Harvard Law School alumni
English King's Counsel